Abdipaşa is a town (belde) and municipality in the Ulus District, Bartın Province, Turkey. Its population is 2,678 (2021). The town consists of the quarters Kadıoğlu, Ulupınar, Yeşilpazar, Derecik and Karadiken.

References

Populated places in Bartın Province
Ulus District
Towns in Turkey